Albert Costa was the defending champion, but lost in the first round this year.

Carlos Moyá won the tournament, beating Francisco Clavet in the final, 6–3, 6–2.

Seeds

Draw

Finals

Top half

Bottom half

External links
 Main draw

Portugal Open
2000 ATP Tour
Estoril Open